Dream Home or dreamhome or variation may refer to:

 Dream Home (2010 film) Hong Kong slasher film
 Dream Home (play) (2016 play) David Williamson comedy
 Dream Home (talk show) (2011 TV series) Philippine talk show
 Mitre 10 Dream Home (1999 debut) New Zealand TV series
 HGTV Dream Home (1997 debut) HGTV USA's home give-a-way
 Dreamhome (2000 debut) Australian TV series, see List of Australian television series
 "Dreamhome (Dream On)" (1993 song) song by "Ten Sharp"
 Dreamhome, Bryant Pond, Woodstock, Maine, USA (1916 estate) NRHP #96001037

See also
 Your Dream Home (1950 book) D-I-Y book
 Dream House (disambiguation)